Strong is the eighth studio album by American country music singer Tracy Lawrence, released in 2004, his only album for the DreamWorks label.  It produced three singles for him on the Billboard Hot Country Singles & Tracks (now Hot Country Songs) charts: "Paint Me a Birmingham" (#4), "It's All How You Look at It" (#35) and "Sawdust on Her Halo" (#48). "Paint Me a Birmingham" was also recorded in 2003 by Ken Mellons on his album Sweet, from which it was released as a single shortly before Lawrence's rendition.

Track listing

Personnel
Dan Dugmore - steel guitar
Shannon Forrest - drums
Paul Franklin - steel guitar
Aubrey Haynie - fiddle, mandolin
Tracy Lawrence - lead vocals
Gary Lunn - bass guitar
Liana Manis - background vocals
Brent Mason - electric guitar
Steve Nathan - piano, keyboards
John Wesley Ryles - background vocals
Biff Watson - acoustic guitar
Bergen White - string arrangements, conductor

Charts

Weekly charts

Year-end charts

References

Allmusic (see infobox)

2004 albums
Tracy Lawrence albums
DreamWorks Records albums